Wilhelm Josef Oomens SJ (14 September 1918 – 27 June 2008) was a Dutch Jesuit and painter.

Wilhelm Josef Oomens was born in The Hague, Netherlands. He studied mathematics, physics and psychology. In 1949, he entered the congregation of the Society of Jesus (Jesuits) and begun a study of philosophy and Catholic theology.

In 1957 he was ordained as a priest. From then on he acted as teacher and director of a grammar school and was longstanding director of the centre of orientation and cultural studies in Limburg. Following heart surgery (1978), he was compelled to leave teaching, but continued as a priest in pastoral care in Sittard, Netherlands, near the border with Germany.

He enjoyed the work, so he asked the Bishop of Aachen, Klaus Hemmerle, to assign him a rectorate. Thus, the Bishop of Aachen appointed him as pastor at St. Antony, Eschweiler-Roehe, where he served until 2005. Here, he worked closely with the composer and church musician Franz Surges. Meanwhile, continued as a painter. He died 27 June 2008 in Nijmegen.

Works
The emphasis of his art was the rendering and interpretation of biblical motifs. He painted mythological scenes (for example, "Phaeton", 1978; "The three Graces", 1983), but this was of less importance that his historic and scriptural motifs.

He painted the Christmas story ("In dulci jubilo", 1991, "The Adoration of the Magi")  and the history of Jesus' suffering (for example "Man of Sorrows", "Stations of the Cross", 1994, "The body of Jesus taken off the cross", 1981 and 1992 and of particular importance "Ecce Homo") and his resurrection and the coronation of the Eucharist ("The doubting Thomas", 1993; "The path to the Light", 1998)

The manner of painting shows the clear influence of such classical Dutch masters as Lucas van Leiden and Hieronymus Bosch.

Philosophy
A focus of Wilhelm Joseph Oomens was the idea of wondering (in the tradition of Aristotle and Fathers of the church). The importance of this he accentuated in a multiplicity of homilies and unpublished writings). For him, he function of painting derived from his confidence in the importance of wondering and reverence.

Literature
 Wilhelm Josef Oomens: Worte in Bildern erleben. Verlag Dohr, 2000 (an anthology of selected works of W.J. Oomens, with meditative texts in English and German)
 150 Jahre Pfarre St. Antonius Eschweiler-Röhe (published by parish, St. Antony, Eschweiler-Roehe, 1995)

External links
 Example of the artist's work

1918 births
2008 deaths
Artists from The Hague
21st-century Dutch Jesuits
20th-century Dutch painters
Dutch male painters
20th-century Dutch Jesuits
20th-century Dutch male artists